Narcondam, India's easternmost island, is a small volcanic island located in the northern Andaman Sea. The island's peak rises to 710 m above mean sea level, and it is formed of andesite. The island is small, covering an area of approximately 6.8 square kilometres. It was classified as a dormant volcano by the Geological Survey of India.

Etymology
The name Narcondam could have been derived from the Tamil word naraka-kundram (நரககுன்றம்), meaning "a pit of Hell," although this may be the result of confusion between it and Barren Island.

History
Until 1986 Burma claimed sovereignty over the island. This claim was given up on reaching agreement with India on the delimitation of the maritime boundary between the two nations in the Andaman Sea, the Coco channel and the Bay of Bengal.

There is a lighthouse on the slopes of Narcondam, established 1983.

Geography
Further to the south west (approximately ) lies the active volcano island of Barren Island. Narcondam Island is about  miles from Burma, and is almost  miles from Vishakhapatnam (part of the mainland of India). It belongs to the East Volcano Islands.

The island is largely forested. The island is formed from a volcano, which had not known to have been active in recent times, until on 8 June 2005 there were reports of "mud and smoke" being ejected from the volcano. The 2004 Indian Ocean earthquake is thought to have caused magma to move underground and may be related to the current activity. If the reports were accurate this would alter the scientific status of Narcondam to active. 
Narcondam Island holds the easternmost point of the Andaman and Nicobar Islands.

Narcondam Mountain
Narcondam Island's volcanic mountain, at 710 meters is the second tallest point in the Andaman and Nicobar Islands, the first being Saddle Peak, North Andaman Island at 752 meters.

Administration
Narcondam Island belongs to the North and Middle Andaman administrative district, and is part of Diglipur Taluk. The village is near the Police station.

Transportation
Narcondam Island is accessible through ships that run from Diglipur. A helicopter facility is also available.

Demographics 
There is only one village.  
According to the 2011 census of India, the Island has one household. The effective literacy rate (i.e. the literacy rate of population excluding children aged six and below) is 100%.

The 16 residents (all supervisory police personnel) are all living in a single household on the northeast corner.
They harvest coconuts and bananas on a small plantation near the post.

Tourism

Scuba diving at Narcondam 
The waters surrounding Narcondam Island are a diving destination. Narcondam's prime dive sites include rocky ridges and steep slopes like Chimneys, Ooh La La and Lighthouse Reef, where massive barrel sponges, huge gorgonian fans and lush soft corals thrive. Fish life can include Napoleon wrasse, bumphead parrotfish and mantas, as well as occasional whitetip and gray reef sharks. Another special place is HQ Pinnacle, where a submerged rock formation acts as a magnet for dogtooth tuna and hundreds of bigeye trevally. For a more tranquil setting, several bays around the island offer gently sloping terrain populated with fields of hard corals and colorful reef fish.

The island is very remote and diving is accessible only via a live-aboard.

Fauna

About 25-32 bird species, both resident and migratory, have been recorded from the island. Of these, the most famous is the Narcondam hornbill  (Rhyticeros narcondami), a threatened hornbill that is endemic to the island. The closest living relative of the bird is the Blyth's hornbill (Rhyticeros plicatus). It has the smallest range of any Asian hornbill and only has a population of between 300 to 650 individuals, but still has a stable population.

As Narcondam is a small volcanic island, not connected to any significant land mass, terrestrial mammalian fauna is of low diversity. However, the island flying fox (Pteropus hypomelanus) and Sikkim rat (Rattus andamanensis) are the most common native mammals on this island. An unidentified small bat was also seen on a survey. Introduced goats (Capra aegagrus hircus) and cats (Felis catus) were formerly present on the island, threatening native fauna, but almost all of them have since been removed. In 2020, a new species of Crocidura shrew was discovered on the island, which was described in 2021 as the Narcondam shrew (Crocidura narcondamica). It and the Narcondam hornbill are presently the only two known endemic fauna of the island.

There are several species of reptile on the island. The most common reptile on the island is the spotted forest skink (Sphenomorphus maculatus), which closely resembles populations of the species from northeast India. Tytler's skink (Eutropis tytleri), a large skink endemic to the Andamans, is also common on the island, with the Narcondam variants being slightly smaller than those on the main Andamans. The Andaman Islands day gecko (Phelsuma andamanensis), Andaman bent-toed gecko (Cyrtodactylus rubidus), Andaman giant gecko (Gekko verrauxi), and Anderson's day gecko (Cnemaspis andersonii), which are all gecko species endemic to the Andaman-Coco island chain, have also been found on Narcondam. The Andaman water monitor (Varanus salvator andamanensis) is the only large predator on the island and preys on the Narcondam hornbill, especially its young. The paradise flying snake (Chrysopelea ornata) has been reported from the island in past surveys. The blue-lipped sea krait (Laticauda laticaudata) is seen in the waters around Narcondam Island.

Narcondam Island Wildlife Sanctuary
Narcondam Island Wildlife Sanctuary is notified as a protected reserve by the government of India. It is also listed on the UNESCO's tentative Lists of World Heritage Sites. The island was notified as a sanctuary to protect and monitor the Narcondam hornbill.

Flora
Narcondam Island is almost entirely covered with evergreen and moist deciduous forest. Grassy slopes dominate the southern and southeast aspects of the hill (BirdLife International 2001). The island is covered with tropical evergreen forest, semi-evergreen forest, moist deciduous forest, littoral forest and mangrove forest (Pande et al. 1991). The island bears old, dead and decaying trees, interlaced with thorny creepers and luxuriantly flowering tall trees (Yahya and Zarri 2002a). The flora on the higher reaches of the hill is mostly evergreen and consists of Dipterocarpus, Sideroxylon and Ficus trees. However, some deciduous species such as Bombax insigne are also present. The vegetation towards the summit is mostly Moist Evergreen with several epiphytes. The lower hills following the shoreline have both deciduous and evergreen trees such as Terminalia catappa, T. bialata and Caryota mitis. The shoreline has some introduced species such as coconut and banana.

Facilities

Radar station
The Indian Coast Guard proposed the construction of a coastal surveillance radar installation on Narcondam Island and had requested for the release of 0.64 ha of forest area for the purpose. This was turned down by the MOEF of UPA govt as it would endanger the population of endemic hornbills while other alternative sites existed for the siting of the radar.
As of 10 June 2014, MOEF has given clearance for the Radar station. Union minister for environment and forests, Prakash Javadekar gave the approval. However, the plan was subsequently modified and as of 2020, no radar installation has been built on the island.

Image gallery

See also

 Exclusive economic zones
 Exclusive economic zone of India
 Exclusive economic zone of Indonesia
 Exclusive economic zone of Malaysia
 Exclusive economic zone of Thailand
 India's Look-East Connectivity projects
 Sabang strategic port development, India-Indonesia project
 Sittwe Port, India-Myanmar project
 Dawei Port Project in Myanmar

 Etreme points
 Indira Point, India's southernmost point of Andaman Nicobar Islands group
 Rondo Island, Indonesia's northernmost island is closest to Indira Point
 Landfall Island, India's northernmost island of Andaman Nicobar Islands group
 Coco Islands, Myanmar's islands in Andaman sea just north of India's Prearis Island
 Extreme points of India
 Extreme points of Indonesia
 Extreme points of Myanmar
 Extreme points of Bangladesh
 Extreme points of Thailand
 Borders of India

 Other topics
 List of volcanoes in India
 List of endangered animals in India
 List of World Heritage Sites in India

References

External links

 Geological Survey of India
 
 Volcano live
 Volcano discovery
 India daily
 Global Volcanism Program

Islands of North and Middle Andaman district
Tourist attractions in the Andaman and Nicobar Islands
Cities and towns in North and Middle Andaman district
Volcanoes of India
Volcanoes of the Indian Ocean
Active volcanoes
Important Bird Areas of the Andaman and Nicobar Islands
Populated places in India
Islands of India
Islands of the Bay of Bengal
World Heritage Tentative List for India